The Coroner's Toolkit (or TCT) is a suite of free computer security programs by Dan Farmer and Wietse Venema for digital forensic analysis. The suite runs under several Unix-related operating systems: FreeBSD, OpenBSD, BSD/OS, SunOS/Solaris, Linux, and HP-UX. TCT is released under the terms of the IBM Public License.

Parts of TCT can be used to aid analysis of and data recovery from computer disasters.

TCT was superseded by The Sleuth Kit. Although TSK is only partially based on TCT, the authors of TCT have accepted it as official successor to TCT.

References

External links

Official home page
Feature: The Coroner's Toolkit
Frequently Asked Questions about The Coroner's Toolkit

Computer forensics
Unix security-related software
Hard disk software
Digital forensics software